Ink Compatible is the second full-length album from Spastic Ink. It was released in 2004 after a four-year process via Ron Jarzombek's EclecticElectric label, except for Japan and Southeast Asia where it was released by Avalon/Marquee. It was released in Russia on Iron d.

An alternate version of the Japanese bonus track, A Quick Affix, can be found as Peppered Cancer on Bobby Jarzombek's instructional drum DVD, Performance & Technique.

Track listing
"Aquanet" – 8:10	
"Just a Little Bit" – 4:42	
"Words for Nerds" – 5:22	
"Melissa's Friend" – 7:08	
"Read Me" – 4:16	
"Multi-Masking" – 8:11	
"In Memory of..." – 6:50	
"A Chaotic Realization of Nothing Yet Misunderstood" – 12:11
"The Cereal Mouse" – 1:20
"A Quick Affix" (Japanese Bonus Track) – 4:40

Personnel
 Jason McMaster - vocals
 Ron Jarzombek - guitar
 Pete Perez - bass 
 Bobby Jarzombek - drums

Guest musicians
 Daniel Gildenlöw (Pain of Salvation) - vocals
 Marty Friedman (ex-Megadeth) - guitars
 Doug Keyser (Watchtower) - bass
 Michael Manring - bass
 Sean Malone (Cynic, Gordian Knot) - bass
 Ray Riendeau (Halford, Machines of Loving Grace) - bass
 Jens Johansson (Stratovarius, ex-Yngwie Malmsteen) - keyboards
 Jimmy Pitts - keyboards
 David Bagsby - keyboards
 David Penna - drums
 Jeff Eber (Dysrhythmia) - drums

References

2004 albums
Spastic Ink albums